Sandokan is a 1976 Italian six-part television series directed by Sergio Sollima, based upon the novels of Emilio Salgari featuring the pirate hero Sandokan. It was followed the next year by a feature-length spin-off film, and another twenty years later by a sequel series named The Return of Sandokan, with Kabir Bedi reprising his role as Sandokan in both.

Plot 
Malaysia, the second half of the 19th century. The English Queen Victoria owns the domain of the eastern lands of Borneo. The occupying British forces are commanded by Lord James Brooke, oppressive and ruthless governor and uncle of the beautiful Marianna Guillonk, nicknamed "The Pearl of Labuan". The brave Sandokan is a young Malaysian prince who has lost his kingdom and title as result of the British annexation. Along with his friend Yanez De Gomera, Sandokan is now the ruler of the isle of Mompracem, a den of pirates who make constant attacks against British forces.

One day Sandokan travels from the island of Malaysia to the lands of Borneo. Lured into a trap, Sandokan is injured in an attack, falls overboard, and is found and treated by the family of Lord Brooke. In fact, the governor does not know Sandokan personally, and mistakes the pirate for an Indian noble. Sandokan plays along with this deception, as Marianna and he have fallen in love with each other. The love between them is not meant to last for long, as Lord Brooke eventually discovers the truth and begins to pursue Sandokan. This culminates in the invasion of Mompracem, in which Sandokan loses both Marianna and his base, but is able to escape and start his resistance against the English anew.

Cast
Kabir Bedi as Sandokan
Carole André as Lady Marianna Guillonk
Philippe Leroy as Yanez De Gomera
Adolfo Celi as James Brooke 
Andrea Giordana as Sir William Fitzgerald
Hans Caninenberg as Lord Guillonk
Milla Sannoner as Lucy Mallory
Renzo Giovampietro as Dr. Kirby 
Franco Fantasia as Captain van Doren

Soundtrack
The musical score for the series was composed and performed by Guido & Maurizio De Angelis under their most famous alias, Oliver Onions. The score, released as an album, also included songs performed by the duo in Italian and English. Their title song, heard under the opening credits, became hugely popular in Italy and Europe.

See also
List of Italian television series

External links

 

1976 Italian television series debuts
1976 Italian television series endings
Television shows based on works by Emilio Salgari
Italian television series
Films scored by Guido & Maurizio De Angelis
Television shows based on Italian novels
Television series set in the 19th century
Television shows set in Malaysia
Television series about pirates
British Empire in fiction